Karaçomak is a village in the Şahinbey District, Gaziantep Province, Turkey. The village is inhabited by Turkmens and Abdals of the Kara Hacılar tribe, and had a population of  252 in 2022. The inhabitants are Alevis and belong to the Hacım Sultan ocak.

References

Villages in Şahinbey District